The Cosmopolitan  was a British weekly newspaper edited for the English speaking community of Buenos Aires.

It newspaper was published between 1831 and 1833, having its last printout on January 9 of that year. Among its editors was Agustín Francisco Wright, an Argentine journalist of English descent.

References 

Defunct newspapers published in Argentina
Publications established in 1831
Publications disestablished in 1833
Weekly newspapers published in Argentina